Helen Stevens Conant (October 9, 1839 – April 17, 1899) was an American author, poet, and translator.

Personal life 
Helen Charlotte Peters Stevens was born to Abiel Stevens and Charlotte Stevens (née Peters) on October 9, 1839 in Methuen, Massachusetts. Her ancestors, John Stevens and Andrew Peters immigrated to Andover, Massachusetts from England in the mid-17th century. As a child, she was taught by a governess and private tutors.

Stevens married journalist and editor Samuel Stillman Conant, son of professor and writer Thomas Jefferson Conant and editor and author Hannah O'Brien Chaplin Conant. Stevens and Conant married on June 10, 1858 in Lawrence, Massachusetts. The couple had one child together, a son named Thomas Peters Conant, on July 11, 1860 in Paris, France. The family later moved to Brooklyn, New York.

Conant died on April 17, 1899 and was buried with her son, who died eight years earlier, in Brooklyn.

Literary works

Books 
Conant is best known for writing The Butterfly Hunters, published in 1868 by Ticknor and Fields. She is also known for A Primer of German Literature (1877) and A Primer of Spanish Literature (1878), both published by Harper & Brothers. Conant co-translated The Ancient Cities of the New World (1887) by Désiré Charnay from French with J. Gonino.

Articles 
Many of Conant's articles were published in various Harper & Brother publications, including Harper's Magazine and Harper's Weekly, for which her husband was managing editor from 1869 until his disappearance in 1885.

 Birds and plumage
 Kitchen and dining-room
 Joseph Mallord William Turner
 A ramble in Central Park
 Picturesque Edinburgh

Poetry 

 From the Spanish of Calderon
 Old German love song (thirteenth century)
 At Manhattan Beach
 Love's Doubt
 "Le Pere Jacques"
 Watch-words

Conant contributed many of her poems to various Harper & Brother publications, including Harper's Bazar, for which she was an editor.

References

External link

19th-century American women writers
19th-century American poets
People from Methuen, Massachusetts
1839 births
American people of English descent
1899 deaths
French–English translators
19th-century American translators